Jersika Station is a railway station serving the settlement of Jersika in the Latgale region of south-eastern Latvia. It is located on the Riga–Daugavpils Railway.

References 

Railway stations in Latvia
Railway stations opened in 1861